Sebastiaan Verschuren (born 7 October 1988) is a Dutch former competitive swimmer who specialized in short- and middle-distance freestyle events. At the 2016 European Aquatics Championships he won the gold medal in the 200 meter freestyle. He participated in the 2012 and 2016 Olympics, finishing 5th in the 100 meter freestyle in 2012.

Swimming career
After competing in the European Junior Swimming Championships in 2005 and 2006 Verschuren made his international senior debut at the 2006 European Aquatics Championships in Budapest, Hungary with a 19th position in the 1500 m freestyle.

Two years later he participated in the 2008 European Aquatics Championships in Eindhoven in his home country, where he reached 13th place in the 200 m freestyle. In the 4 × 200 m freestyle, he finished 9th in the heats, just missing out on the final and qualification for the 2008 Summer Olympics.

At the 2012 Olympics in London, Verschuren finished 5th in the final of the 100 m freestyle.  He also competed in the 200 m freestyle and the 4 x 100 m medley relay.

Verschuren qualified for the 2016 Summer Olympics in Rio de Janeiro in the 100 and 200 meter freestyle, and the 4 × 200 meter freestyle relay. In the 200 meter freestyle, he finished 11th in the semifinals.

Personal bests

See also
 List of Dutch records in swimming

References

External links
 Official Website

1988 births
Living people
Dutch male freestyle swimmers
Olympic swimmers of the Netherlands
Swimmers from Amsterdam
Swimmers at the 2012 Summer Olympics
Swimmers at the 2016 Summer Olympics
European Aquatics Championships medalists in swimming
World Aquatics Championships medalists in swimming
21st-century Dutch people